Argynnis sagana is a species of butterfly in the family Nymphalidae.

Description
This species displays little geographical variations, but it is well known for the significant differences (sexual dimorphism) between males (orange-brown wings with black markings) and females (dark brown or black wings with white bands), so individuals of different sexes can be mistakenly attributed to different species.

The caterpillars are dark brown, with long yellowish appendages similar to thorns.

Biology
This butterfly has a single brood and flies from July to September depending on the location. They feed on Viola species (Viola grypoceras, Viola verecunda, Viola eizanensis, Viola uniflora).

Distribution and habitat
This species is present in broadleaves or mixed light forests of China, Mongolia, South Eastern Siberia, Korea and Japan.

Taxonomy
This species used to be included in a monotypic genus called Damora Nordmann, 1851, which is now regarded as a junior synonym of Argynnis.

Subspecies
Argynnis sagana sagana Doubleday, 1847
Argynnis sagana liane Fruhstorfer, 1907 (Nagasaki)
Argynnis sagana relicta Korshunov, 1984 (Kemerovo Region, Southern Siberia)
Argynnis sagana paulina Nordman, 1851 (Irkutsk, Siberia)
Argynnis sagana nordmanni  Korshunov, 1984 (Amur region, Blagoveshchensk Region).
Argynnis sagana ilona Fruhstorfer, 1907 (Tsushima Island)

References
 Biolib
 Funet

External links
 Russian Insects
 Y-field

Argynnis
Butterflies described in 1847